[[File:J52-KittyHawk.JPG|thumb|P&W J52-P-408 being worked on in the [[USS Kitty Hawk (CV-63)|USS Kitty Hawks]] jet shop]]

The Pratt & Whitney J52 (company designation JT8A) is an axial-flow dual-spool turbojet engine originally designed for the United States Navy, in the 40 kN (9,000 lbf) class. It powered the A-6 Intruder and the AGM-28 Hound Dog cruise missile.  the engine was still in use in models of the A-4 Skyhawk.

The engine is the basis for the Pratt & Whitney JT8D, a popular civilian low-bypass turbofan engine.

Design and development

The J52 was developed in the mid-1950s for the US Navy as a scaled-down derivative of the J57/JT3A. It was initially intended to power the A4D-3 Skyhawk, an advanced avionics model that was canceled in 1957. After being canceled, the U.S. Air Force selected the J52 to power the AGM-28 Hound Dog cruise missile. The engine was designed with several unique features for this application, including a "conical centerbody mounted in the intake" and a "variable central plug ... in the nozzle". Then, in 1958, the US Navy selected the engine to power what became the A-6 Intruder.

The J52-P-6 model, designed for the YA2F-1 (YA-6A) Intruder, had a unique nozzle that could be angled downward at 23 degrees for STOL takeoffs; this was not used on production A-6s. Returning full circle, the J52 was selected to power the A4D-5, another model of the A-4 Skyhawk, remaining in all subsequent new-built models.

The twin-spool J52 employs a split 12-stage axial compressor consisting of a five-stage low pressure unit and a seven-stage high pressure unit. Behind the compressor is a nine-unit can-annular combustion chamber and a two-stage split turbine.

Operational history

In 1960, U.S. Air Force's Strategic Air Command (SAC) developed procedures so that the Boeing B-52 Stratofortress could use the Hound Dog's J52 engine for additional thrust while the missile was located on the bomber's two pylons. This helped heavily laden B-52s fly away from their airbases faster, which would have been useful in case of nuclear attacks on the bases. The Hound Dog could then be refueled from the B-52's wing fuel tanks.

Variants

J52-P-3
Flown in: AGM-28 Hound Dog. This variant produced  of thrust. The design of the P-3 model included a variable inlet duct to improve engine efficiency at the various altitudes the cruise missile was designed to fly at.
J52-P-6
Flown in: A-6A. This variant produced  of thrust and included the 23-degree downward swiveling nozzle.
J52-P6A
Flown in: A-4E, TA-4J, EA-6B (the first few). This variant produced  of thrust.
J52-P-8A/B
Flown in: A-4F/G/H/K, TA-4E/F/G/H, A-6E, EA-6B. This variant produced  of thrust.
J52-P-408
Flown in: A-4M/N, TA-4KU, EA-6B. This variant included variable inlet guide vanes (VIGV''') in the LPC, air-cooled turbine blades, and produced  of thrust. Still in operation with Argentina, Brazil, and Indonesia
J52-P-409
(PW1212)  thrust version of the J52-P-408 with an improved low pressure turbine (LPT) and faster acceleration. Designed for the EA-6B and was additionally marketed as an upgrade for the A-4. The J52-P-409 was also proposed as a cost-effective upgrade to the A-6E as an alternative to the A-6F Intruder II, but was not purchased. The P-409 engine was also proposed for use in the EA-6B ADVCAP, but that program was canceled after three prototypes were built and flown.   The P-409 would have been available as a new engine or as an upgrade kit for P-408 engines, but was never ordered in significant quantities."Uprated A-4 Marketed" (1988). Flight International, Feb. 13, 1988. p.16.
PW1212J52-P-409 re-designated
PW1216
An afterburning derivative of the J52-P409 engine proposed for the Grumman Sabre II concept (the project later evolved into the JF-17 Thunder).
JT8ACompany designation for initial versions of the J52
JT8B-1(J52-P-6 / P-6A)
JT8B-3(J52-P-8A)

Applications
 AGM-28 Hound Dog
 Dassault Super Mystère
 Douglas A-4 Skyhawk
 Grumman A-6 Intruder
 Lockheed Martin A-4AR Fightinghawk
 Northrop Grumman EA-6B Prowler
 LIMRV -  On 14 August 1974, the LIMRV achieved a world record speed of 255.7 mph (411.5 km/h)

Specifications (J52-P-408)

See also

References

Notes

Bibliography

 Gunston, Bill. World Encyclopedia of Aero Engines. Cambridge, England. Patrick Stephens Limited, 1989. 
 Jane's Information Group. Pratt & Whitney J52''. Jane's Aero Engines. Modified 29 May 2009.

External links

 Pratt & Whitney - J52

1950s turbojet engines
J52